Grit Müller (born 6 June 1972) is a retired German swimmer who won a silver medal in the 800 m freestyle at the 1991 World Aquatics Championships and a bronze medal in the 400 m individual medley at the 1989 European Aquatics Championships. She also won six national titles in the 4×200 m relay (1988), 400 m freestyle (1991), 800 m freestyle (1990) and 400 m medley (1989–91).

References

1972 births
Living people
German female swimmers
German female freestyle swimmers
German female medley swimmers
World Aquatics Championships medalists in swimming
European Aquatics Championships medalists in swimming
Sportspeople from Schwedt
20th-century German women
21st-century German women